Hippopodius hippopus is a species of siphonophores in the family Hippopodiidae.

References 

Hippopodiidae
Animals described in 1776